Photo fraud may refer to:

 Violation of journalism ethics and standards in the area of photojournalism:
 Photo manipulation
 Adnan Hajj photographs controversy
 2006 Lebanon War photographs controversies